The Ranger's Dormitory at the South Rim of Grand Canyon National Park was built in 1920–21. Originally built as a worker's dormitory, it was converted for use by rangers in 1927. The stone building was designed by Daniel Ray Hull of the National Park Service Branch of Plans and Designs, and is a precursor of the later National Park Service Rustic style.

The dormitory is one of the earliest National Park Service-built structures at the South Rim. The gable ends are sheathed in wood. The ground falls away from front to back, so that the back door has a stone stairway. The interior features an entrance hall and a large communal room with a stone fireplace at the western end, with a central hall running down the center to the rear door with individual rooms on either side.

The dormitory was placed on the National Register of Historic Places on September 5, 1975. It is included in the Grand Canyon Village National Historic Landmark District.

See also
Architects of the National Park Service

References

Park buildings and structures on the National Register of Historic Places in Arizona
Residential buildings completed in 1920
Grand Canyon
Rustic architecture in Arizona
Buildings and structures in Coconino County, Arizona
Residential buildings on the National Register of Historic Places in Arizona
Buildings and structures in Grand Canyon National Park
1920 establishments in Arizona
National Register of Historic Places in Coconino County, Arizona
National Register of Historic Places in Grand Canyon National Park
Individually listed contributing properties to historic districts on the National Register in Arizona